1944 in philosophy

Events 
 Johannes Vilhelm Jensen was awarded the Nobel Prize in Literature "for the rare strength and fertility of his poetic imagination with which is combined an intellectual curiosity of wide scope and a bold, freshly creative style".

Publications 
 Ernst Cassirer, An Essay on Man (1944)
 Karl Polanyi, The Great Transformation (1944)
 Erwin Schrödinger, What Is Life? (1944)
 Friedrich Hayek, The Road to Serfdom (1944)
 Charles Stevenson, Ethics and Language (1944)

Philosophical literature 
 Jorge Luis Borges, Ficciones (1944) and A New Refutation of Time (1944)
 Jean-Paul Sartre, No Exit (1944)

Births 
 February 23 - Ronald K. Hoeflin, American philosopher
 February 27 - Roger Scruton, English philosopher (d. 2020)
 June 23 - Peter Bieri, Swiss philosopher and novelist 
 October 2 - Vernor Vinge, American speculative fiction writer

Deaths 
 July 31 - Antoine de Saint-Exupéry (born 1900)
 October 2 - Benjamin Fondane (born 1898)
 December 30 - Romain Rolland (born 1866)

References 

Philosophy
20th-century philosophy
Philosophy by year